Licensed to Kill is an Eastmancolor 1965 superspy imitation James Bond film starring Tom Adams as British secret agent Charles Vine. It was directed and co-written by Lindsay Shonteff. Producer Joseph E. Levine picked it up for American and worldwide distribution and reedited it under the title The Second Best Secret Agent in the Whole Wide World.

The theme song for the American version, composed by Sammy Cahn and Jimmy Van Heusen and performed by Sammy Davis, Jr., is used in the 2011 film drama Tinker Tailor Soldier Spy.

Plot
Facing numerous assassination attempts, a Swedish scientist who has invented an anti-gravity device and his daughter seek to provide the invention to the United Kingdom. With James Bond unavailable, H.M. Government provides Agent Charles Vine (Tom Adams), a former mathematician, as a bodyguard and assassin.

Cast
 Tom Adams as Charles Vine
 Karel Stepanek as Henrik Jacobsen
 Peter Bull as Masterman
 John Arnatt as Rockwell
 Francis de Wolff as Walter Pickering
 Felix Felton as Tetchnikov
 Veronica Hurst as Julia Lindberg
 Judy Huxtable as Computer Center Girl
 Carol Blake as Crossword Puzzle Girl
 Claire Gordon as Hospital Doctor 
 Denis Holmes as Maltby
 Gary Hope as "Army Officer" 
 Billy Milton as Wilson
 Oliver MacGreevy as First Russian Commissar 
 George Pastell as Second Russian Commissar
 Tony Wall as Sadistikov 
 Stuart Saunders as Police Inspector
 Robert Marsden as August Jacobsen
 Paul Tann as Vladimir Sheehee

Production
Based on the success of the film, Columbia Pictures offered director Shonteff a five-picture contract, but they disagreed over conditions.

Welsh Trinity College, Oxford graduate and former RAF Intelligence Howard Griffiths emigrated to Australia where he wrote extensively for Australian television series such as the spy series Hunter (1967), and police shows Division 4, Homicide, and Blue Heelers.

U.S. release 

Joseph E. Levine had great financial success after cheaply purchasing an Italian film called Hercules and releasing it in America with a massive publicity campaign, and decided to do the same with Licensed to Kill. However, the American release reedited the film by having the opening assassination performed by a mother pulling a Sten gun out of her pram of twins being changed to a pre-credit scene. Levine engaged songwriters Sammy Cahn and Jimmy Van Heusen to write a title song performed by Sammy Davis Jr and arranged and conducted by Claus Ogerman over the credits with the new title. The American release then eliminated scenes of Francis de Wolff talking to John Arnatt about seeking Bond for the assignment, and of Vine in bed with a girl and a crossword puzzle giving double entendre clues. The American release also eliminates much of the dialogue about the anti-gravity device, called "Regrav", which makes the denouement of the film less comprehensible.

The American publicity for the film echoed the "Number 2, but tries harder" advertising of the Avis Rent a Car System prevalent at the time. Levine launched a November 1965 nationwide 100 word essay contest to be titled "the most unforgettable second-best secret agent I have known".

Reception
Alan Burton in Historical Dictionary of British Spy Fiction wrote positively of the film, describing it as "a cut-price James Bond picture with plenty of thrills and some wit", and wrote of Tom Adams as Charles Vine as doing "a passable imitation of Sean Connery".

Sequels
What Eon Productions's reaction was to the blatant imitation is not known, but Shonteff was missing from the two Vine sequels starring Tom Adams:

 Where the Bullets Fly (1966) (directed by Warwick Films and Hammer Films director John Gilling) that was also released by Embassy Films.
 Somebody's Stolen Our Russian Spy/O.K. Yevtushenko (1967) a film shot in Spain instead of the usual UK location, that languished in a film laboratory until 1976.

Shonteff later made three spy films with the hero named "Charles Bind". In the first, his boss is also named Rockwell:

 Number One of the Secret Service (1977) starring Nicky Henson.
 Licensed to Love and Kill aka The Man from S.E.X. (1979) starring Gareth Hunt.
 Number One Gun (1980) starring Michael Howe.

References

External links
 
 
 
 

1965 films
British spy films
Films directed by Lindsay Shonteff
1960s parody films
1960s spy comedy films
Embassy Pictures films
Parody films based on James Bond films
1965 comedy films
1960s English-language films